Close to Perfection is a 1985 Hi-NRG album by Miquel Brown, produced by Ian Levine and Fiachra Trench. The album includes the single "Close to Perfection" and the hard rock-influenced "Black Leather." Others singles released from the album include "One Way Street" and "Love Reputation" both getting extended club mixes, The album has been issued on CD three times: 1991 (USA), 1995 (UK) and 2014 (UK). As part of a two CD set featuring remixes and rarities from Manpower and Close To Perfection albums featuring sleeve notes and new interviews with Ian Levine .

Track listing 
Tracks written and arranged by Ian Levine and Fiachra Trench unless stated
 "One Hundred Per Cent" – 7:32
 "Learn the Lines of Love" – 6:13
 "Close to Perfection" – 8:10
 "White Lace" (Miquel Brown) – 4:59 
 "The Easy Way Out" – 7:42
 "Love Reputation" – 3:53
 "Black Leather" – 7:52
 "One Way Street" (Levine, Trench, Brown) – 9:43
 "Blind Date" – 3:39

1985 albums
Miquel Brown albums